Dores André Rodríguez (born 1985) is a Spanish ballet dancer. She is currently a principal dancer at the San Francisco Ballet.

Early life
André was born in Vigo, Spain, to a professor and a doctor. When she was eleven, she was sent to a small ballet studio at her hometown. Two years later, she was spotted by Maria de Avila at a competition, and joined her school in Zaragoza, which is eight hours away from Vigo. When she was seventeen, she was supposed to compete in the Prix de Lausanne, but had to withdraw after she broke her leg. She considered going to college instead but ultimately chose to pursue a career in ballet.

Career
André briefly danced in a company in Florence, Italy. Then, she auditioned for the San Francisco Ballet, and joined the company as a member of the corps de ballet in 2004. She became a soloist in 2012 and a principal dancer in 2015. Roles she performed include the title role in Cinderella, Myrtha in Giselle, Juliet in Romeo and Juliet and Olga in Onegin. She had also originated roles, such as Christopher Wheeldon's Bound To and Justin Peck's Hurry Up, We're Dreaming. In 2018, she returned and performed in a gala in Zaragoza, where she had her training.

As a designer, André had designed costumes for Estonian National Ballet and Ballet Idaho. She is currently working on costumes for Royal New Zealand Ballet's The Sleeping Beauty.

Selected repertoire
André's repertoire with the San Francisco Ballet includes:

Personal life
André is a feminist.

André grew up swimming and painting before she started ballet. In off-season, she swims five times a week with her sister, who is a competitive open-water swimmer, and paints as a hobby. She is also learning tap dancing. She lives in Twin Peaks, San Francisco.

References

External links
Dores André - San Francisco Ballet profile
Dores André and Joseph Walsh on Coppélia
Dores André and Wei Wang in Bluebird Pas de Deux

Spanish ballerinas
San Francisco Ballet principal dancers
Living people
1985 births
People from Vigo
21st-century ballet dancers
21st-century Spanish dancers
Spanish expatriates in the United States
Prima ballerinas